"Free" is a song written by Robert Lamm as a part of the "Travel Suite" for the rock band Chicago and recorded for their third album Chicago III (1971), with Terry Kath singing lead vocals. It was the first single released from this album, and peaked at #20 on the U.S. Billboard Hot 100.

Personnel
 Terry Kath – lead vocals, guitar
 Robert Lamm – keyboards, backing vocals
 Peter Cetera – bass, backing vocals
 Danny Seraphine – drums, percussion
 James Pankow – trombone
 Lee Loughnane – trumpet
 Walter Parazaider – alto saxophone

References

1971 singles
Chicago (band) songs
Songs written by Robert Lamm
Song recordings produced by James William Guercio
Columbia Records singles
1971 songs